Maramureș International Airport  is a minor international airport in northwest Romania, located in Tăuții-Măgherăuș,  west of Baia Mare municipality and in the historic region of Maramureș.

Airlines and destinations
The following airlines operate regular scheduled and charter flights at Maramureș Airport:

Statistics

Note - From January 2016 until July 2018 the airport was under upgrade works. From March 16 2020 until June 12 2020 the airport was closed for works.

See also
Aviation in Romania
Transport in Romania

References

External links

 Official website
 Google Map - Aerial View
 

Airports in Romania
Maramureș
Buildings and structures in Maramureș County
Airports established in 1966
1966 establishments in Romania